Douglas J. Sloan is a filmmaker, known for his documentaries on the lives and work of renowned artists and photographers, such as photographers William Klein, Annie Leibovitz, Elliott Erwitt, William Eggleston, Helmut Newton, Diane Arbus and John G. Morris.

Career and work
Over the course of a thirteen year partnership with the International Center of Photography Museum in New York Sloan created over one hundred film profiles on photographers, artists, and writers for their annual Infinity Awards program. Highlights include: Helmut Newton, Arnold Newman, William Eggleston, Diane Arbus, Thomas Ruff, Hiroshi Sugimoto, Don McCullin and James Nachtway,

Sloan's Elliott Erwitt: I Bark at Dogs won the 'Short Doc - Audience Award' at the 2011 Austin Film Festival  and was awarded 'Best Documentary' at the Aspen Shortsfest in 2012. In 2011, Sloan and Erwitt attended a screening of the film during the DocNYC festival at the IFC Center in Manhattan.

In 2012, Sloan completed a short documentary film titled Saigon '68. The film tells the little-known back story of photographer Eddie Adams's Pulitzer Prize winning photograph of General Nguyễn Ngọc Loan executing a Vietcong prisoner, Nguyễn Văn Lém, on a Saigon street, on February 1, 1968. Saigon '68 features testimony from a number of notable figures, central to the reportage of the Vietnam War, including Hal Buell, Bill Eppridge, James S. Robbins, Richard Pyle, Walter Anderson, Morley Safer, Bob Schieffer, and Peter Arnett.

Sloan is the recipient of 24 CINE Awards for excellence in film.

Sloan has also directed TV commercials and branded campaigns for the web. He has worked extensively with JWT, on projects for Energizer and Macy's, bringing a documentary approach to commercial media. With production company Icontent, Sloan has filmed for Under Armour, Helzberg Diamonds, The Hollywood Reporter and Vaseline Men (a campaign featuring NFL Champion Michael Strahan).

He is developing a drama feature based on the life story of Eddie Adams.

Filmography 
 A Face to a Name (2002) – documentary examining victims who died in the September 11 attacks. Original music by Todd Rundgren
 William Klein Out of Necessity (2008)
 Annie Leibovitz So, There You Go (2009)
 John G. Morris: Eleven Frames (2010)
 Elliott Erwitt: I Bark at Dogs (2011)
 Saigon '68 (2012)

References

External links 
 Interview with Sloan on "Elliott Erwitt: I Bark at Dogs."
  Icontent.tv
 
 An evening with Elliott Erwitt
 New York Festivals: Winners
   SourceCreative

American film directors
American documentary filmmakers
Living people
Year of birth missing (living people)